Borov is a village in Slovakia. 

Borov may also refer to:
Borov Kamak, a waterfall in Bulgaria
Ilčo Borov (born 1966), a Macedonian football striker

See also
Borova (disambiguation)